Hull Street is a prominent street in Savannah, Georgia, United States. It is interrupted by Colonial Park Cemetery from Abercorn Street to Habersham Street. Originally known only as Hull Street singular, its addresses are now split between "West Hull Street" and "East Hull Street", the transition occurring at Bull Street in the center of the downtown area. Hull Street is named for commodore Isaac Hull, who served in the War of 1812. The street is entirely within Savannah Historic District, a National Historic Landmark District.

Hull Street passes through three squares on their northern side. From west to east:

Orleans Square
Chippewa Square
Crawford Square

Notable buildings and structures

Below is a selection of notable buildings and structures on Hull Street, all in Savannah's Historic District. From west to east:

John H. Ash House, 114–116 West Hull Street (1817)
Julius Perlinski House, 22 West Hull Street (circa 1903)
John Scudder Property (I), 20 West Hull Street (1858)
John Scudder Property (II), 18 West Hull Street (1857)
Louis Knorr Property, 16 West Hull Street (1896)
Honora Foley Property ("Foley House Inn"), 14 West Hull Street (1896)

References

Roads in Savannah, Georgia
Streets in Georgia (U.S. state)